The 1991 edition of the Women's Handball Tournament of the African Games was the 3rd, organized by the African Handball Confederation and played under the auspices of the International Handball Federation, the handball sport governing body. The tournament was held, in Cairo, Egypt, contested by 6 national teams and won by Angola.

Draw

Knockout stage
Championship bracket

Final ranking

Awards

References

External links
 Official website

Handball at the 1991 All-Africa Games
Women's handball in Egypt
1991 in women's handball
Handball at the African Games